Datuk Sulaiman Taha (died 17 December 2010, aged 59) was a Malaysian politician. He was a member of the Johor State Legislative Assembly from 2004 until his death in 2010. He was a member of the United Malay National Organisation in the Barisan Nasional coalition, and held the seat for Tenang. He served as assistant secretary of Umno Youth from 1987 to 1993 and as executive secretary of the Johor Umno liaison committee from 1994 to 1997.

Election results

Family
Sulaiman Taha was married to Seri Noraini Yaakop and had seven children: son Aiman Azri Taha and daughters Marsila, Marliza, Marina, Miza Liyana Taha, Miza Qamarina and Miza Husna.

References

1951 births
2010 deaths
Malaysian people of Malay descent
Malaysian Muslims
United Malays National Organisation politicians
Members of the Johor State Legislative Assembly